The 1908–09 Trinity Blue and White's basketball team represented Trinity College (later renamed Duke University) during the 1908-09 men's college basketball season. The head coach was Wilbur Wade Card and the team finished with an overall record of 8–1.

Schedule

|-

References

Duke Blue Devils men's basketball seasons
Duke
1908 in sports in North Carolina
1909 in sports in North Carolina